Matheus Humberto Maximiano or simply Matheus (マテウス | born 31 May 1989 in Campinas, São Paulo) is a Brazilian footballer who plays as a midfielder for Caldense.

Career
On 13 July 2011, Matheus joined the South Korean K-League club Daegu FC on loan from Avaí Futebol Clube. After a short loan spell at the K-League outfit, he signed a three-year contract on a permanent deal.

In 2013, he returned to his country and joined Portuguesa.

Club statistics
Updated to 23 February 2017.

References

External links
Profile at Thespakusatsu Gunma 

1989 births
Living people
Brazilian footballers
Brazilian expatriate footballers
Avaí FC players
Associação Portuguesa de Desportos players
Daegu FC players
Guarani FC players
Sociedade Esportiva Itapirense players
Grêmio Esportivo Juventus players
Thespakusatsu Gunma players
Grêmio de Esportes Maringá players
Esporte Clube XV de Novembro (Piracicaba) players
Clube Atlético Penapolense players
Novoperário Futebol Clube players
Nacional Atlético Clube (SP) players
Associação Atlética Caldense players
Campeonato Brasileiro Série A players
Campeonato Brasileiro Série D players
K League 1 players
K League 2 players
J2 League players
Brazilian expatriate sportspeople in South Korea
Brazilian expatriate sportspeople in Japan
Expatriate footballers in South Korea
Expatriate footballers in Japan
Association football midfielders
Sportspeople from Campinas